The E-class trams were a class of single bogie (four-wheel) single-ended cross-bench design trams operated on the Sydney tram network. They always operated in permanently-coupled pairs because they were fitted-out electrically as if the pair was a single bogie car.

History
In 1901, two prototypes were built by the Randwick Tramway Workshops. Deemed a success, a further 200 were built by Clyde Engineering and Meadowbank Manufacturing Company in 1902/03. They were introduced for the electrification of the Eastern Suburbs lines, but also operated services on the North Shore lines.

Withdrawals commenced in 1934; two pairs (499+500 and 529+530) were fitted with track brakes for the Neutral Bay service, with 529+530 lasting in service until 1955.

Numbers
Randwick Tramway Workshops: (1901) 396, 397
Clyde Engineering: (1902/03) 413-560, 611, 612
Meadowbank Manufacturing Company: (1902/1903) 561-610

Preservation
Two have been preserved:
529 & 530 at the Sydney Tramway Museum

References

Further reading

External links

Trams in Sydney
Tram vehicles of Australia